Robert Strange McNamara (June 9, 1916 – July 6, 2009) was an American business executive and the eighth United States Secretary of Defense, serving from 1961 to 1968 under Presidents John F. Kennedy and Lyndon B. Johnson. He remains the longest serving Secretary of Defense, having remained in office over seven years. He played a major role in promoting the United States' involvement in the Vietnam War. McNamara was responsible for the institution of systems analysis in public policy, which developed into the discipline known today as policy analysis.

He was born in San Francisco, California, graduated from UC Berkeley and Harvard Business School and served in the United States Army Air Forces during World War II. After the war, Henry Ford II hired McNamara and a group of other Army Air Force veterans to work for Ford Motor Company. These "Whiz Kids" helped reform Ford with modern planning, organization, and management control systems. After briefly serving as Ford's president, McNamara accepted appointment as Secretary of Defense.

McNamara became a close adviser to Kennedy and advocated the use of a blockade during the Cuban Missile Crisis. Kennedy and McNamara instituted a Cold War defense strategy of flexible response, which anticipated the need for military responses short of massive retaliation. McNamara consolidated intelligence and logistics functions of the Pentagon into two centralized agencies: the Defense Intelligence Agency and the Defense Supply Agency. During the Kennedy administration, McNamara presided over a build-up of US soldiers in South Vietnam. After the 1964 Gulf of Tonkin incident, the number of US soldiers in Vietnam escalated dramatically. McNamara and other US policymakers feared that the fall of South Vietnam to a Communist regime would lead to the fall of other governments in the region.

McNamara grew increasingly skeptical of the efficacy of committing American troops to South Vietnam. In 1968, he resigned as Secretary of Defense to become President of the World Bank. He served as President of the World Bank until 1981, shifting the focus of the World Bank from infrastructure and industrialization towards poverty reduction. After retiring, he served as a trustee of several organizations, including the California Institute of Technology and the Brookings Institution. In his later writings and interviews, he expressed regret for the decisions he made during the Vietnam War.

Early life and career
Robert McNamara was born in San Francisco, California. His father was Robert James McNamara, sales manager of a wholesale shoe company, and his mother was Clara Nell (Strange) McNamara. His father's family was Irish and, in about 1850, following the Great Irish Famine, had emigrated to the U.S., first to Massachusetts and later to California. He graduated from Piedmont High School in Piedmont, California in 1933, where he was president of the Rigma Lions boys club and earned the rank of Eagle Scout. McNamara attended the University of California, Berkeley and graduated in 1937 with a B.A. in economics with minors in mathematics and philosophy. He was a member of the Phi Gamma Delta fraternity, was elected to Phi Beta Kappa in his sophomore year, and earned a varsity letter in crew. Before commissioning into the Army Air Force, McNamara was a Cadet in the Golden Bear Battalion at U.C. Berkeley. McNamara was also a member of the UC Berkeley's Order of the Golden Bear, a fellowship of students and leading faculty members formed to promote leadership within the student body. He then attended Harvard Business School, where he earned an M.B.A. in 1939.

Immediately thereafter, McNamara worked a year at Price Waterhouse, a San Francisco accounting firm. He returned to Harvard in August 1940 to teach accounting in the Business School and became the institution's highest-paid and youngest assistant professor at that time. Following his involvement there in a program to teach analytical approaches used in business to officers of the United States Army Air Forces, he entered the USAAF as a captain in early 1943, serving most of World War II with its Office of Statistical Control. One of his major responsibilities was the analysis of U.S. bombers' efficiency and effectiveness, especially the B-29 forces commanded by Major General Curtis LeMay in India, China, and the Mariana Islands. McNamara established a statistical control unit for the XX Bomber Command and devised schedules for B-29s doubling as transports for carrying fuel and cargo over The Hump. He left active duty in 1946 with the rank of lieutenant colonel and with a Legion of Merit.

Ford Motor Company

In 1946, Tex Thornton, a colonel under whom McNamara had served, put together a group of former officers from the Office of Statistical Control to go into business together. Thornton had seen an article in Life magazine portraying Ford as being in dire need of reform. Henry Ford II, himself a World War II veteran from the Navy, hired the entire group of ten, including McNamara.

They helped the money-losing company reform its chaotic administration through modern planning, organization, and management control systems. Because of their youth, combined with asking many questions, Ford employees initially and disparagingly referred to them as the "Quiz Kids". The Quiz Kids rebranded themselves as the "Whiz Kids".

Starting as manager of planning and financial analysis, McNamara advanced rapidly through a series of top-level management positions. McNamara had Ford adopt computers to construct models to find the most efficient, rational means of production, which led to much rationalization. McNamara's style of "scientific management" with his use of computer spreadsheets featuring graphs showing trends in the auto industry were regarded as extremely innovative in the 1950s and were much copied by other executives in the following decades. In his 1995 memoirs, McNamara wrote: "I had spent fifteen years as a manager [at Ford] identifying problems and forcing organizations—often against their will—to think deeply and realistically about alternative courses of action and their consequences". He was a force behind the Ford Falcon sedan, introduced in the fall of 1959—a small, simple and inexpensive-to-produce counter to the large, expensive vehicles prominent in the late 1950s. McNamara placed a high emphasis on safety: the Lifeguard options package introduced the seat belt (a novelty at the time) and a dished steering wheel, which helped to prevent the driver from being impaled on the steering column during a collision.

After the Lincoln line's very large 1958, 1959, and 1960 models proved unpopular, McNamara pushed for smaller versions, such as the 1961 Lincoln Continental.

On November 9, 1960, McNamara became the first president of Ford Motor Company from outside the Ford family since John S. Gray in 1906.

Secretary of Defense
After his election in 1960, President-elect John F. Kennedy first offered the post of Secretary of Defense to Robert A. Lovett, who had already served in that position in the Truman administration; Lovett declined but recommended McNamara. Kennedy had read about McNamara and his career in a Time magazine article on December 2, 1960, and interviewed him on December 8, with his brother and right-hand man Robert F. Kennedy also being present. McNamara told Kennedy that he didn't know anything about government, to which Kennedy replied: "We can learn our jobs together. I don't know how to be president either". McNamara had read Kennedy's ghostwritten book Profiles in Courage and asked him if he had really written it himself, with Kennedy insisting that he did. McNamara's confidence and self-assurance impressed Kennedy. Kennedy offered McNamara the chance to be either Secretary of Defense or Secretary of the Treasury; McNamara came back a week later, accepting the post of Secretary of Defense on the condition of having the right of final approval in all appointments to the Department of Defense, with Kennedy replying: "It's a deal". McNamara's salary as the CEO of Ford ran to some $3 million dollars per year while by contrast the position of the Defense Secretary paid only $25,000 per year. Given the financial sacrifices, McNamara was able to insist to Kennedy that he have the right to appoint his officials and run the Pentagon his own way.

According to Special Counsel Ted Sorensen, Kennedy regarded McNamara as the "star of his team, calling upon him for advice on a wide range of issues beyond national security, including business and economic matters." McNamara became one of the few members of the Kennedy Administration to work and socialize with Kennedy, and he became close to Attorney General Robert F. Kennedy, eventually serving as a pallbearer at the younger Kennedy's funeral in 1968.

Initially, the basic policies outlined by President Kennedy in a message to Congress on March 28, 1961, guided McNamara in the reorientation of the defense program. Kennedy rejected the concept of first-strike attack and emphasized the need for adequate strategic arms and defense to deter nuclear attack on the United States and its allies. U.S. arms, he maintained, must constantly be under civilian command and control, and the nation's defense posture had to be "designed to reduce the danger of irrational or unpremeditated general war." The primary mission of U.S. overseas forces, in cooperation with its allies, was "to prevent the steady erosion of the Free World through limited wars". Kennedy and McNamara rejected massive retaliation for a posture of flexible response. The U.S. wanted choices in an emergency other than "inglorious retreat or unlimited retaliation", as the president put it. Out of a major review of the military challenges confronting the U.S. initiated by McNamara in 1961 came a decision to increase the nation's "limited warfare" capabilities. These moves were significant because McNamara was abandoning President Dwight D. Eisenhower's policy of massive retaliation in favor of a flexible response strategy that relied on increased U.S. capacity to conduct limited, non-nuclear warfare.

The Kennedy administration placed particular emphasis on improving the ability to counter communist "wars of national liberation", in which the enemy avoided head-on military confrontation and resorted to political subversion and guerrilla tactics. As McNamara said in his 1962 annual report, "The military tactics are those of the sniper, the ambush, and the raid. The political tactics are terror, extortion, and assassination." In practical terms, this meant training and equipping U.S. military personnel, as well as allies such as South Vietnam, for counterinsurgency operations.

During the Cuban Missile Crisis in October 1962, McNamara served as a member of EXCOMM and played a large role in the Administration's handling and eventual defusing of the Cuban Missile Crisis. He was a strong proponent of the blockade option over a missile strike and helped persuade the Joint Chiefs of Staff to agree with the blockade option.

Increased attention to conventional strength complemented these special forces preparations. In this instance, he called up reserves and also proceeded to expand the regular armed forces. Whereas active duty strength had declined from approximately 3,555,000 to 2,483,000 between 1953 (the end of the Korean War) and 1961, it increased to nearly 2,808,000 by June 30, 1962. Then the forces leveled off at around 2,700,000 until the Vietnam military buildup began in 1965, reaching a peak of nearly 3,550,000 by mid-1968, just after McNamara left office. Kennedy, who was fascinated with counterinsurgency warfare, made a major push to develop the Special Forces, popularly known as the Green Berets. The U.S. Army leadership was, for the most part, strongly opposed to the counterinsurgency vogue, and stoutly resisted the presidential pressure for more counterinsurgency training and forces. The U.S. Army, for reasons of bureaucratic politics, budgetary reasons and sheer pride, wanted to be equipped to fight a conventional war in central Europe against the Soviet Army, with a large number of divisions armed with expensive hi-tech weapons designed for maximum firepower, instead of having small teams of Special Forces armed with relatively low tech weapons like assault rifles fight in a Third World country.

Nuclear strategy and triad doctrine
When McNamara took over the Pentagon in 1961, the United States military relied on an all-out nuclear strike to respond to a Soviet attack of any kind, which would kill Soviet military forces and civilians. This was the same nuclear strategy planned by the Strategic Air Command (SAC), led by General Curtis LeMay. McNamara did not agree with this approach. He sought other options after seeing that this strategy could not guarantee the destruction of all Soviet nuclear weapons, thus leaving the United States vulnerable to retaliation. The subject educated NATO members on the Cold War doctrine of deterrence. McNamara's alternative in the doctrine of counterforce was to try to limit the United States nuclear exchange by targeting only enemy military forces. This would prevent retaliation and escalation by holding Soviet cities hostage to a follow-up strike. McNamara later concluded that counterforce was not likely to control escalation but to provoke retaliation. The U.S. nuclear policy remained the same.

Other steps
McNamara took other steps to increase U.S. deterrence posture and military capabilities. He raised the proportion of Strategic Air Command (SAC) strategic bombers on 15-minute ground alert from 25% to 50%, thus lessening their vulnerability to missile attack. In December 1961, he established the United States Strike Command (STRICOM). Authorized to draw forces when needed from the Strategic Army Corps (STRAC), the Tactical Air Command, and the airlift units of the Military Air Transport Service and the military services, Strike Command had the mission "to respond swiftly and with whatever force necessary to threats against the peace in any part of the world, reinforcing unified commands or... carrying out separate contingency operations." McNamara also increased long-range airlift and sealift capabilities and funds for space research and development. After reviewing the separate and often uncoordinated service efforts in intelligence and communications, McNamara in 1961 consolidated these functions in the Defense Intelligence Agency and the Defense Communications Agency (the latter originally established by SoD Robert Gates in 1960), having both report to the Secretary of Defense through the JCS. The end effect was to remove the Intelligence function from the control of the military and to put it under the control of the Secretary of Defense. In the same year, he set up the Defense Supply Agency to work toward unified supply procurement, distribution, and inventory management under the control of the Secretary of Defense rather than the uniformed military.

McNamara's institution of systems analysis as a basis for making key decisions on force requirements, weapon systems, and other matters occasioned much debate. Two of its main practitioners during the McNamara era, Alain C. Enthoven and K. Wayne Smith, described the concept as follows: "First, the word 'systems' indicates that every decision should be considered in as broad a context as necessary... The word 'analysis' emphasizes the need to reduce a complex problem to its component parts for better understanding. Systems analysis takes a complex problem and sorts out the tangle of significant factors so that each can be studied by the method most appropriate to it." Enthoven and Smith said they used mainly civilians as systems analysts because they could apply independent points of view to force planning. McNamara's tendency to take military advice into less account than had previous secretaries and to override military opinions contributed to his unpopularity with service leaders. It was also generally thought that Systems Analysis, rather than being objective, was tailored by the civilians to support decisions that McNamara had already made.

The most notable example of systems analysis was the Planning, Programming and Budgeting System (PPBS) instituted by United States Department of Defense Comptroller Charles J. Hitch. McNamara directed Hitch to analyze defense requirements systematically and produce a long-term, program-oriented defense budget. PPBS evolved to become the heart of the McNamara management program. According to Enthoven and Smith, the basic ideas of PPBS were: "the attempt to put defense program issues into a broader context and to search for explicit measures of national need and adequacy"; "consideration of military needs and costs together"; "explicit consideration of alternatives at the top decision level"; "the active use of an analytical staff at the top policymaking levels"; "a plan combining both forces and costs which projected into the future the foreseeable implications of current decisions"; and "open and explicit analysis, that is, each analysis should be made available to all interested parties, so that they can examine the calculations, data, and assumptions and retrace the steps leading to the conclusions." In practice, the data produced by the analysis was so large and so complex that while it was available to all interested parties, none of them could challenge the conclusions.

Among the management tools developed to implement PPBS were the Five Year Defense Plan (FYDP), the Draft Presidential Memorandum (DPM), the Readiness, Information and Control Tables, and the Development Concept Paper (DCP). The annual FYDP was a series of tables projecting forces for eight years and costs and manpower for five years in mission-oriented, rather than individual service, programs. By 1968, the FYDP covered ten military areas: strategic forces, general-purpose forces, intelligence and communications, airlift and sealift, guard and reserve forces, research and development, central supply and maintenance, training and medical services, administration and related activities, and support of other nations.

The Draft Presidential Memorandum (DPM)—intended for the White House and usually prepared by the systems analysis office—was a method to study and analyze major defense issues. Sixteen DPMs appeared between 1961 and 1968 on such topics as strategic offensive and defensive forces, NATO strategy and force structure, military assistance, and tactical air forces. OSD sent the DPMs to the services and the Joint Chief of Staff (JCS) for comment; in making decisions, McNamara included in the DPM a statement of alternative approaches, force levels, and other factors. The DPM in its final form became a decision document. The DPM was hated by the JCS and uniformed military in that it cut their ability to communicate directly to the White House. The DPMs were also disliked because the systems analysis process was so heavyweight that it was impossible for any service to effectively challenge its conclusions.

The Development Concept Paper examined performance, schedule, cost estimates, and technical risks to provide a basis for determining whether to begin or continue a research and development program. But in practice, what it proved to be was a cost burden that became a barrier to entry for companies attempting to deal with the military. It aided the trend toward a few large non-competitive defense contractors serving the military. Rather than serving any useful purpose, the overhead necessary to generate information that was often in practice ignored resulted in increased costs throughout the system.

The Readiness, Information, and Control Tables provided data on specific projects, more detailed than in the FYDP, such as the tables for the Southeast Asia Deployment Plan, which recorded by month and quarter the schedule for deployment, consumption rates, and future projections of U.S. forces in Southeast Asia.

Cuban Missile Crisis

The Cuban Missile Crisis was between the United States and the Soviet Union lasting for 13 days in October 1962. During this time, Robert McNamara was serving as Secretary of Defense and one of John F. Kennedy's trusted advisors. When Kennedy received confirmation of the placement of offensive Soviet missiles in Cuba, he immediately set up 'Executive Committee', referred to as 'ExComm'. This committee included United States government officials, including Robert McNamara, to advise Kennedy on the crisis. Kennedy instructed ExComm to immediately come up with a response to the Soviet threat unanimously without him present.

The Joint Chiefs of Staff favored launching air strikes against the Soviet missile sites in Cuba, an opinion that McNamara did not hold and advised Kennedy against the chiefs, warning that air strikes would almost certainly be crossing the Rubicon. McNamara's relations with the hawkish Joint Chiefs of Staff had been strained during the crisis, and his relations with Admiral George Anderson and General Curtis LeMay were especially testy. Both Admiral Anderson and General LeMay had favored invading Cuba, welcomed the prospect of a war with Soviet Union under the grounds that a war with the Soviet Union was inevitable, and whose attitudes towards Kennedy and McNamara had verged on insubordination. Admiral Anderson had at a one point ordered McNamara out of the Naval Operations Room, saying that as a civilian he was unqualified to be making decisions about naval matters, leading McNamara to say that he was the Defense Secretary and Anderson was unqualified to be ordering him to do anything.  

During this time it was confirmed the crisis had to be resolved within 48 hours by receiving two messages from Nikita Khrushchev. The first message, an informal one, stated if the United States guaranteed to not invade Cuba then they would take the missiles out. The second message, a more formal one, was broadcast on the radio stating if the United States attacked then Cuba was prepared to retaliate with masses of military power. Although American defense planning focused on using nuclear weapons, Kennedy and McNamara saw it was clear the use of strategic weapons could be suicidal. On Tuesday October 16, ExComm had their first meeting. The majority of officials favored an air attack on Cuba in hopes to destroy the missile sites, although the vote was not unanimous which brought them to other alternatives. By the end of the week, ExComm came up with four different alternative strategies to present to the president: a blockade, an air strike, an invasion, or some combination of these. These actions are known as OPLAN 312, OPLAN 314 and OPLAN 316. A quarantine was a way to prevent the Soviets from bringing any military equipment in or out of Cuba. During the final review of both alternatives on Sunday, October 21, upon Kennedy's request, McNamara presented the argument against the attack and for the quarantine. On Wednesday, October 24 at 10:00 am EDT, the quarantine line around Cuba went into effect. Following Cuba's aftermath, McNamara stated, "There is no such thing as strategy, only crisis management."

After the crisis McNamara recommended to Kennedy that Admiral  Anderson and General LeMay be sacked. However, Kennedy was afraid of a Congressional backlash if he sacked two of the chiefs at once. Moreover, Kennedy did not wish for his disagreements with the Joint Chiefs to become public and felt that sacking two of the chiefs at once would lead to speculation in the media about such a disagreement. Kennedy told McNamara: "All right, You can fire one. Which one will it be?"  Without hesitation, McNamara answered "Anderson". Later on in 1963, a White House release announced that Admiral Anderson was the new American ambassador to Portugal.

Cost reductions
McNamara's staff stressed systems analysis as an aid in decision making on weapon development and many other budget issues. The secretary believed that the United States could afford any amount needed for national security, but that "this ability does not excuse us from applying strict standards of effectiveness and efficiency to the way we spend our defense dollars.... You have to make a judgment on how much is enough." Acting on these principles, McNamara instituted a much-publicized cost reduction program, which, he reported, saved $14 billion in the five-year period beginning in 1961. Although he had to withstand a storm of criticism from senators and representatives from affected congressional districts, he closed many military bases and installations that he judged unnecessary for national security. He was equally determined about other cost-saving measures.

Due to the nuclear arms race, the Vietnam War buildup and other projects, Total Obligational Authority (TOA) increased greatly during the McNamara years. Fiscal year TOA increased from $48.4 billion in 1962 (equal to $ billion in ) to $49.5 ($) billion in 1965 (before the major Vietnam increases) to $74.9 ($) billion in 1968, McNamara's last year in office (though he left office in February). Not until FY 1984 did DoD's total obligational authority surpass that of FY 1968 in constant dollars.

Program consolidation
One major hallmark of McNamara's cost reductions was the consolidation of programs from different services, most visibly in aircraft acquisition, believing that the redundancy created waste and unnecessary spending. McNamara directed the Air Force to adopt the Navy's F-4 Phantom and A-7 Corsair combat aircraft, a consolidation that was quite successful. Conversely, his actions in mandating a premature across-the-board adoption of the untested M16 rifle proved catastrophic when the weapons began to fail in combat, though later congressional investigations revealed the causes of these failures as negligence and borderline sabotage on behalf of the Army ordnance corps' officers. McNamara tried to extend his success by merging development programs as well, resulting in the TFX dual service project to combine Navy requirements for a Fleet Air Defense (FAD) aircraft and Air Force requirements for a tactical bomber. His experience in the corporate world led him to believe that adopting a single type for different missions and service would save money. He insisted on the General Dynamics entry over the DOD's preference for Boeing because of commonality issues. Though heralded as a fighter that could do everything (fast supersonic dash, slow carrier and short airfield landings, tactical strike and even close air support), in the end it involved too many compromises to succeed at any of them. The Navy version was drastically overweight and difficult to land, and eventually canceled after a Grumman study showed it was incapable of matching the abilities of the newly revealed Soviet MiG-23 and MiG-25 aircraft. The F-111 would eventually find its niche as a tactical bomber and electronic warfare aircraft with the Air Force.

However, many analysts believe that even though the TFX project itself was a failure, McNamara was ahead of his time as the trend in fighter design has continued toward consolidation—the F-16 Falcon and F/A-18 Hornet emerged as multi-role fighters, and most modern designs combine many of the roles the TFX would have had. In many ways, the Joint Strike Fighter is seen as a rebirth of the TFX project, in that it purports to satisfy the needs of three American air arms (as well as several foreign customers), fulfilling the roles of strike fighter, carrier-launched fighter, V/STOL, and close air support (and drawing many criticisms similar to those leveled against the TFX).

Vietnam War

Into Vietnam

During President John F. Kennedy's term, while McNamara was Secretary of Defense, America's troops in South Vietnam increased from 900 to 16,000 advisers, who were not supposed to engage in combat but rather to train the Army of the Republic of Vietnam (ARVN).

The Truman and Eisenhower administrations had committed the United States to support the French and native anti-Communist forces in Vietnam in resisting efforts by the Communists in the North to unify the country, though neither administration established actual combat forces in the war. The U.S. role—initially limited to financial support, military advice and covert intelligence gathering—expanded after 1954 when the French withdrew. During the Kennedy administration, the U.S. military advisory group in South Vietnam steadily increased, with McNamara's concurrence, from 900 to 16,000. U.S. involvement escalated after the Gulf of Tonkin incidents in August 1964, involving two purported attacks on a U.S. Navy destroyer by North Vietnamese naval vessels.

In the Kennedy administration, McNamara was closely allied in debates in the cabinet with Dean Rusk, the Secretary of State, with both favoring greater American support for South Vietnam. Initially, the main concern of the new Kennedy administration was Laos, not South Vietnam. In February 1961, McNamara spoke in favor of intervention in Laos, saying that six AT-6 planes owned by the Central Intelligence Agency could be fitted to carry 200-pound bombs in support of General Phoumi Nosavan's forces. Rusk shot down that proposal, saying his World War Two experiences in Burma had taught him that bombing was ineffective in the jungles and six planes were not enough. In the spring of 1961 Kennedy seriously considered intervening in Laos where the Communist Pathet Lao, supported by North Vietnam, were winning the civil war. At one point, the Joint Chiefs of Staff advised sending 60,000 U.S. troops into Laos. However, Laos was a backward, landlocked country with barely any modern roads and only two modern airfields, both of which were quite small by western standards, which would have made for a logistical nightmare. Furthermore, memories of the Korean War were still fresh, and it was generally accepted if the United States sent in troops into Laos, it was almost certain that China would do likewise, thus leading to another Sino-American war. The Southeast Asia Treaty Organization (SEATO) was split with its European members such as France and Britain stoutly opposed to intervention in Laos while its Asian members such as Thailand and the Philippines were all for intervention in Laos. McNamara noted to Kennedy it was quite possible that the two airfields in Laos could be seized by the Communist forces, which would cut off any U.S forces in Laos, thus turning the intervention into a debacle. At a meeting on 29 April 1961, when questioned by the Attorney-General, Robert F. Kennedy, McNamara stated that "we should take a stand in Thailand and South Vietnam", pointedly omitting Laos from the nations in Southeast Asia to risk a war over.

McNamara soon changed his mind about Laos. On 1 May 1961, he advised President Kennedy to send in ground troops into Laos, saying "we must be prepared to win", and advising using nuclear weapons if China should intervene. On 2 May, McNamara, using more strong language, told Kennedy that the United States should definitely intervene in Laos, even though he was very certain that it would lead to Chinese intervention, concluding that "at some point, we may have to initiate the use of nuclear weapons to prevent the defeat of our forces". Kennedy, who was distrustful of the hawkish advice given by the Joint Chiefs of Staff after the failure of the Bay of Pigs invasion, instead decided to seek a diplomatic solution to the Laos crisis at a peace conference in Geneva in 1961–62 that ultimately led to an agreement to make Laos officially neutral in the Cold War. The problems posed by the possibility of a war with China and the logistical problems of supporting a large units of troops in Laos led McNamara ultimately favor an alternative strategy of having a small number of U.S Army Special Forces operate in Laos working with American allies such as the Hmong hill tribes. On 29 September 1961, the Joint Chiefs of Staff estimated to McNamara that if Chinese forces entered Laos, then the SEATO forces would need at least 15 divisions consisting of some 278, 000 men to stop them. At the same time, the Joint Chiefs also estimated that the two airfields in Laos were capable of landing some 1, 000 troops a day each, which would give the advantage to the Chinese. Such dire assessments led Kennedy to ignore McNamara and the Joint Chiefs, and to favor a diplomatic solution the Laos crisis.

In October 1961, when General Maxwell Taylor and Walt Whitman Rostow advised sending 8,000 American combat troops to South Vietnam, McNamara rejected that recommendation as inadequate, stating that 8,000 troops would "probably not tip the scales decisively", instead recommending to Kennedy that he send 6 divisions to South Vietnam. Kennedy rejected that advice. In May 1962, McNamara paid his first visit to South Vietnam, where he told the press "every quantitative measurement...shows that we are winning the war". Led by General Paul D. Harkins, the officers of the Military Assistance Command, Vietnam altered a map that showed too much of South Vietnam under Viet Cong control, and massaged the statistics to make the Viet Cong appear weaker than they were. McNamara's "quantitative" style based upon much number-crunching by computers about trends in Vietnam missed the human dimension. Aspects of the war such popular views and attitudes in South Vietnam, and that the South Vietnamese president Ngô Đình Diệm favored a "divide and rule" strategy of having multiple government departments compete against one another as a way of staying in power were missed by McNamara's "quantitative" approach as there was no way that computers could calculate these aspects of the war. Though McNamara had supported plans to intervene in Laos in 1961, by 1962 he had changed his mind. During a discussion with General Lyman Lemnitzer, the chairman of the Joint Chiefs of Staff, McNamara had stumped him by asking him what the United States would do in the event of several scenarios in Laos, none of which Lemnitzer and the chiefs were capable of answering. The inability of the Joint Chiefs to answer McNamara's questions about what the United States should do if North Vietnam should stage a major offensive down the Mekong river valley from Laos into Cambodia and finally South Vietnam persuaded McNamara that the Joint Chiefs had no vision of the issues, and were merely advocating intervention in Laos to avoid looking weak.

In 1962, McNamara supported a plan for mass spraying of the rice fields with herbicides in the Phu Yen mountains to starve the Viet Cong out, a plan that was only stopped when W. Averell Harriman pointed out to Kennedy that the ensuing famine would kill thousands of innocent people. In late 1962, McNamara ordered planning to withdraw the American advisers from South Vietnam in 1964 as according to Pentagon calculations the war should be won by then. At the time, McNamara told Kennedy: "There is a new feeling of confidence that victory is possible".

On 2 January 1963, McNamara's rosy projections and assumptions based upon what his computers had told him about Vietnam were rudely shattered by the Battle of Ap Bac, that began when three Viet Cong (VC) companies were encircled by the ARVN's 7th Division in the village of Ap Bac.  Despite being outnumbered by a factor of 10–1 and being outgunned having only rifles compared to the 7th Division’s tanks, artillery, armored personnel carriers and helicopters, the VC defeated the 7th Division in the ensuing battle and escaped into the jungle. Colonel John Paul Vann, the American adviser attached to the 7th Division summed up the battle in a report in his usual earthy language as: "A miserable fucking performance, just like what it always is". Vann, a colorful figure whose outspokenly blunt criticism of how the war was being fought made him a favorite of the media, was much disliked by McNamara, who did not appreciate the criticism as he continued to insist that the war was being won.

Vann's reports criticizing Diệm's regime as corrupt and incompetent were most unwelcome to McNamara who contended that the reforms advocated by Vann were unnecessary. In March 1963, Vann resigned from the Army as he was informed that his career was over. After the Battle of Ap Bac, a debate began in the Kennedy cabinet about the viability of the Diệm regime, which was reinforced by the Buddhist crisis, which began in May 1963.  When the subject of supporting a coup against Diệm was first raised by Kennedy at a National Security Council meeting in August 1963, McNamara spoke in favor of retaining Diệm. On 31 August 1963, Paul Kattenburg, a diplomat newly returned from Saigon suggested at a meeting attend by Rusk, McNamara and Vice President Johnson that the United States should end support for Diem and leave South Vietnam to its fate. McNamara was stoutly opposed to Kattenburg's suggestion, saying "we have been winning the war".

Unable to gain a consensus about what to do, in September 1963, Kennedy sent McNamara and General Taylor on a "fact-finding mission" to South Vietnam. At a meeting in the Gia Long Palace, President Diem showed McNamara various graphs and charts that purported to be proof that the war was being won, a performance that convinced McNamara the war was as good as won. Kennedy wanted a negative assessment of Diệm to justify supporting a coup, but McNamara and Taylor instead wrote about the "great progress" achieved by Diệm and confidently predicted that the "bulk" of the American advisers would leave in 1965 as by that point they predicted the VC insurgency would be crushed. McNamara predicted that if Diệm continued his policies, that by 1965 the insurgency would be "little more than organized banditry". With the CIA and the ambassador Henry Cabot Lodge Jr. urging support for a coup while the Pentagon was opposed, Kennedy vacillated and finally being unable to make up his mind, gave the power of decision to Lodge. Lodge, who detested Diệm, gave his approval to the generals plotting against him.

On 1 November 1963, the coup was launched.  After the presidential palace was overrun in the fighting, Diệm was captured trying to flee Saigon and executed on 2 November 1963. The new government in Saigon was headed by General Dương Văn Minh. On 22 November 1963, Kennedy was assassinated and succeeded by Lyndon Johnson. In December 1963, Johnson sent McNamara on another "fact-finding mission" to South Vietnam to assess General Minh's performance.  On 19 December 1963, McNamara reported the situation was "very disturbing" as the "current trends, unless reversed in the next two or three months, will lead to neutralization at best or more likely to a Communist-controlled state". He also admitted that the computer models and statistics, which he had attached such importance to, were "grossly in error" and that government control of rural areas had "in fact been deteriorating...to a far greater extent than we realized" since July. Regarding Minh's regime McNamara wrote at present "there is no organized government in South Vietnam". Though McNamara admitted that the new regime was "indecisive and drifting", he advised Johnson to undertake "more forceful moves if the situation does not show early signs of improvement". On 30 January 1964, General Minh was overthrown in a bloodless coup d'état by General Nguyễn Khánh. The change in leadership did not affect the war. Lyman Kirkpatrick of the CIA reported in February 1964 after visiting Saigon that he was "shocked by the number of our people and of the military, even those whose job is always to say we are winning, who feel the tide is against us". The same month saw a VC battalion in the Mekong Delta escape from a larger force of South Vietnamese troops, who had been rated as some of the very best in the ARVN by the American advisers who had trained them, a battle that underscored the problems in the ARVN.

On 8 March 1964, McNamara visited South Vietnam to report to President Johnson about how well the new regime of Khánh was handling the war. Upon landing in Saigon, McNamara told the press: "We shall stay for as long it takes to ...win the battle against the Communist insurgents". During his visit, McNamara spoke memorized phrases in mangled Vietnamese (McNamara kept forgetting that Vietnamese is a tonal language) in speeches praising Khánh as South Vietnam's "best possible leader". McNamara always ended his speeches by shouting out what he thought was a phrase meaning "Long live a free Vietnam!", but as he used the wrong tones, instead he said "Vietnam, go to sleep!" McNamara pressed Khánh to put South Vietnam on a war footing by conscripting all able-bodied young men into the military, which he promised he would do. Khánh did not keep his promise as wealthy and middle class South Vietnamese families objected to having their sons conscripted, and as a result the burden of conscription called by Khánh's national service law fell only on sons of poor families, provoking much resentment. After returning to Washington on 13 March, McNamara reported to Johnson that the situation had "unquestionably been growing worse" since his last visit in December 1963 with 40% of the countryside now under "Vietcong control or predominant influence"; most of the South Vietnamese people were displaying "apathy and indifference"; the desertion rate in the ARVN was "high and increasing" while the VC were "recruiting energetically". The "greatest weakness" accordingly to McNamara was the "uncertain viability" of Khánh's government, which might be overthrown at any moment as the ARVN was ridden with factionalism and intrigue.

To save South Vietnam, McNamara recommended that the United States make it "emphatically clear" its willingness to support Khánh to the hilt. Other recommendations, which were accepted in a National Security Council "action memorandum" called for the United States to pay for an increase in the ARVN, provide the Republic of Vietnam Air Force with more planes and helicopters, and for the United States to pay for more civil servants to administer rural South Vietnam. More importantly, the "action memorandum" redefined the Vietnam War as not only important for Asia, but for the entire world as the document asserted the global credibility of the United States was now at stake as it was claimed America's allies would lose faith in American promises if the South Vietnamese government were overthrown. The "action memorandum" argued that to "lose" South Vietnam would fatally weaken American global leadership, making the war a "test case" of American willingness to continue as a global power.

In April 1964, Senator Wayne Morse called the war "McNamara's War". In response, McNamara told the press that he was honored, saying "I think it is a very important war, and I am pleased to be identified with it and do whatever I can to win it". In May 1964, Senator Richard Russell advised Johnson against relying too much on McNamara, saying "McNamara is the smartest fella any of us know. But he's got too much-he's opinionated as hell-and he's made up his mind". Russell told Johnson that he should find an expert, preferably a World War Two general who was "not scared to death of McNamara" to go to South Vietnam to say that the war was unwinnable and that the United States should pull out, advice that Johnson rejected.

Although South Vietnam by 1964 was receiving a sum of American economic and military aid that ran to $2 million per day, the South Vietnamese state was falling apart with corruption reaching such a point that most South Vietnamese civil servants and soldiers were not being paid while the projects for "rural pacification" that the United States had paid for had collapsed as the money had instead been stolen. The advice that McNamara and other American officials gave to the South Vietnamese to make reforms to crack down on corruption and make the government more effective was always ignored as by this point the South Vietnamese government knew very well that the Americans, having repeatedly promised in public that they would never permit the "loss" of South Vietnam, were now prisoners of their own rhetoric. The threats to withhold aid were bluffs, which the South Vietnamese exposed by simply ignoring the American advice, leading to a situation whereby Stanley Karnow, the Vietnam correspondent for Time noted:"...America lacked leverage...For the South Vietnamese knew that the United States could not abandon them without damaging its own prestige. So despite their reliance on American aid, now more than a half-billion dollars a year, they could safely defy American dictates. In short, their weakness was their strength". One South Vietnamese minister told Karnow at the time: "Our big advantage over the Americans is that they want to win the war more than we do". To compensate for the weaknesses of the South Vietnamese state, by late winter of 1964, senior officials in the Johnson administration such as McNamara's deputy, William Bundy, the assistant secretary of defense, were advocating American intervention in the war. Such intervention presented a constitutional problem: to intervene on the scale envisioned would mean waging war, and only Congress had the legal power to declare war.  Fearful of causing a war with China, Johnson was opposed to the plans of Khánh to invade North Vietnam, and he was even less enthusiastic about having the United States invade North Vietnam. To declare war on North Vietnam would lead to irresistible political pressure at home to invade North Vietnam. As such, the solution was floated for Congress to pass a resolution granting Johnson the power to wage war in Vietnam.

By 1964, the U.S. Navy sent destroyers into the Gulf of Tonkin to support raids by South Vietnamese commandos on North Vietnam and to gather intelligence. Captain John J. Herrick of the Maddox reported that the "torpedo boats" were almost certainly just radar "blips" caused by the "freak weather effects" of the storm and the reports of an attack on his ship were due to an "overeager" radar operator who mistook the motors of the ship for the rush of torpedoes. Johnson promptly seized upon the reports of an attack on a Navy warship in international waters to ask Congress to pass a resolution giving him the authority to wage war in Vietnam. McNamara, via Admiral U. S. Grant Sharp Jr. of the Pacific fleet, put strong pressure on Herrick to say that his ship had been attacked by torpedo boats, despite his strong doubts on the subject. On 5 August 1964, McNamara appeared before Congress to present proof of what he claimed was an attack on the Navy's warships in international waters of the Gulf of Tonkin and stated it was imperative that Congress pass the resolution as quickly as possible. Records from the Lyndon Johnson Library have indicated that McNamara may have misled Johnson on the purported attack on a U.S. Navy destroyer by allegedly withholding recommendations from US Pacific Commanders against executing airstrikes. McNamara was also instrumental in presenting the event to Congress and the public as justification for escalation of the war against the communists. In 1995, McNamara met with former North Vietnam Defense Minister , who told his American counterpart that the August 4 attack never happened, a conclusion McNamara eventually came to accept.

President Johnson ordered Operation Pierce Arrow, retaliatory air strikes on North Vietnamese naval bases. Congress approved, with only Senators Wayne Morse (D-OR), and Ernest Gruening (D-AK), voting against, The Gulf of Tonkin Resolution, authorizing the president "to take all necessary measures to repel any armed attack against the forces of the U.S. and to prevent further aggression." Regardless of the particulars of the incident, the larger issue would turn out to be the sweeping powers granted by the resolution. It gave Johnson virtually unfettered authority to expand retaliation for a relatively minor naval incident into a major land war involving 500,000 American soldiers. "The fundamental issue of Tonkin Gulf involved not deception but, rather, misuse of power bestowed by the resolution," McNamara wrote later. Though Johnson now had the authority to wage war, he proved reluctant to use it, for example by ignoring the advice of the Joint Chiefs of Staff to bomb North Vietnam after a VC attack on Bien Hoa Air Base killed five Americans and destroyed 5 B-57 bombers. Knowing of Johnson's hesitance, on 1 December 1964 McNamara recommended a "graduated" response program, urging Johnson to launch Operation Barrel Roll, a bombing offensive against North Vietnamese supply lines along the Ho Chi Minh Trail in the southern part of Laos, which was approved by the president. On Christmas Eve 1964, the VC bombed the Brinks Hotel in Saigon, killing two Americans. Despite McNamara's recommendations to bomb North Vietnam, Johnson still hesitated.

McNamara at war
In 1965, in response to increased military activity in South Vietnam by VC insurgents and North Vietnamese regular forces, the U.S. began bombing North Vietnam, deployed large military forces and entered into combat in South Vietnam. McNamara's plan, supported by requests from top U.S. military commanders in Vietnam, led to the commitment of 485,000 troops by the end of 1967 and almost 535,000 by June 30, 1968. In January 1965, McNamara together with the National Security Adviser McGeorge Bundy co-wrote a memo to President Johnson stating "both of us are now pretty well convinced that our present policy can lead only to disastrous defeat" as it was hopeless to expect the unstable and corrupt South Vietnamese government to defeat the VC who were steadily "gaining in the countryside". Bundy and McNamara wrote "the time for has come for hard choices" as the United States now had the alternatives of either negotiating with North Vietnam to "salvage what little can be preserved" or to resort to intervention to "force a change". Both Bundy and McNamara stated that they favored the latter, arguing that the commitment of U.S troops to fight in South Vietnam and a strategic bombing campaign against North Vietnam were now required. McNamara's hawkish stance on Vietnam was well known in Washington and many in the press often referred to the war as "McNamara's war" as he was the one in the cabinet always pressing for greater American involvement.

In February 1965, the VC attacked the American airfield at Pleiku, killing 8 Americans and destroying 10 aircraft. After hearing of the attack, Johnson assembled his national security team together with the Speaker of the House of Representatives, John W. McCormack, and the Senate Majority Leader, Mike Mansfield, to announce "I've had enough of this". Only Mansfield and the Vice President, Hubert Humphrey, objected to Johnson's plans to bomb North Vietnam. Aircraft from the carrier, launched Operation Flaming Dart bombing the North Vietnamese army base at Đồng Hới later that day. McNamara was forced to tell Johnson that the Flaming Dart raids had done little damage owing to the heavy clouds, which caused the pilots to miss when dropping their bombs, and more raids would be needed. On 11 February, Johnson ordered more bombing raids, and 2 March approved Operation Rolling Thunder, a strategic bombing offensive against North Vietnam that was originally planned to last eight weeks, and instead went on for three years. After the bombing raids started, General William Westmoreland of the Military Assistance Command, Vietnam (MACV), cabled Johnson to say that Da Nang Air Base was vulnerable as he had no faith in the ability of the South Vietnamese to protect it, leading him to ask for American troops to be deployed instead. On 8 March 1965, two battalions from the United States Marine Corps were landed at Danang, making the beginning of the ground war for the United States. On 20 April, McNamara urged Johnson to send 40,000 troops to Vietnam, advice that was accepted.

By June 1965, Westmoreland was reporting that South Vietnam was faced with a "collapse", which would require 180,000 troops to stop, which would be just a "stopgap", and another 100,000 troops would be needed "to seize the initiative from the enemy". McNamara's advice in July 1965 to Johnson was to commit more 180,000 troops to South Vietnam together with a stepped up aerial offensive to destroy North Vietnam's economy was called by Bundy "rash to the point of folly". Bundy stated that for Johnson to agree to McNamara's request to send more troops "was a slippery slope toward total U.S. responsibility and corresponding fecklessness on the Vietnamese side". Bundy argued that it was the responsibility of the South Vietnamese government to stop the VC and that if the Americans continued to do all the fighting, then the United States would lack the necessary leverage to pressure Saigon into making reforms, turning "...the conflict into a white man's war, with the United States in the shoes of the French". To resolve the debate, later in July 1965, McNamara visited South Vietnam on yet another "fact-finding mission" for President Johnson and met the new South Vietnamese Premier, Air Marshal Nguyễn Cao Kỳ, who had just overthrown Khánh. Air Marshal Kỳ wore a flamboyant uniform which he had designed himself of a white jacket, black pants, red socks and black shoes which led McNamara to dub him as looking "like a saxophone player in a second-rate nightclub". McNamara was not impressed with Kỳ, reporting to Johnson that he saw little evidence that he was capable of winning the war, and the United States would have to send more troops to South Vietnam. Upon his return to the United States, McNamara told the press that the U.S forces in Vietnam were inflicting "increasingly heavy losses" on the VC, but in private told President Johnson that the situation was "worse than a year ago".

McNamara also advised the president that by early 1966 he would have to send 100,000 more troops to South Vietnam in order to win the war, and he would need to mobilize the Reserves and state National Guards as well. Johnson accepted the first recommendation while rejecting the latter, disregarding Bundy's warnings that to send more troops would paradoxically mean less leverage over South Vietnam. To mobilize the Reserves and National Guards would mean having to call up hundreds of thousands of men from civilian life, which would inevitably disrupt the economy, which in turn would require ending the peacetime economy and putting the economy on a war footing. Johnson rejected a wartime economy as imposing too many sacrifices on ordinary Americans while threatening his chances for reelection. Because the Reserves were never called up, the Army had to send much of its manpower to Vietnam, leaving the U.S divisions in Western Europe in a "skeletal" condition as there was a shortage of volunteers. To make up the shortfall, the Army had to rely upon the draft, which caused much domestic opposition, especially as the draft system offered generous exemptions for those attending university and college, leading to the burden of the draft falling disproportionately upon men from poorer families. Because of the refusal to call up the Reserves, McNamara had to increase the draft call in July 1965 from 17,000 per month to 35,000 per month. As most of the 18 and 19-year-old draftees had a high school diploma or less, this also led to a decline in the Army's intellectual standards, with many officers complaining that most of the draftees were not intelligent enough to be trained for technical duties or promoted up the ranks. Throughout the war, the chairman of the Joint Chiefs of Staff, General Earle Wheeler, pressed very strongly for the reserves and national guards to be called out, saying the war was steadily ruining the U.S. Army. Though McNamara warned the president in July 1965 that the war would cost an extra $10 billion dollars in defense spending over the next year, Johnson at a press conference said his administration would be spending only an extra $300–400 million dollars until January 1966. McNamara warned that the increased spending would spark inflation and raise the deficit, advising Johnson to ask Congress to increase taxes to forestall those eventualities. Johnson responded that Congress would not vote for higher taxes, leading McNamara to argue that the president should at least try, saying "I would rather fight for what's right and fail than not try". Johnson snapped: "Goddammit, Bob, that's what's wrong with you-you aren't a politician".

On 2 November 1965, Norman Morrison, a Quaker burned himself alive in the parking lot of the Pentagon to protest the war. All McNamara saw from his office was the smoke rising from the parking lot, but he was sufficiently troubled by the incident that he refused to discuss it with his family, all the more so because his wife Margey was opposed to the war and sympathized with Morrison's feelings, if not his suicide. On 7 November 1965, McNamara sent Johnson a memo saying that the "substantial loss of American lives" in Vietnam was worth the sacrifice in order to contain China, which McNamara called the world's most dangerous nation. McNamara wrote that the deployment of troops to South Vietnam would "make sense only if they are in support of a long-term United States policy to contain China", writing that the process of "containing" China would require "American attention, money and, from time to time unfortunately lives".

The casualty lists mounted as the number of troops and the intensity of fighting escalated. McNamara put in place a statistical strategy for victory in Vietnam. He concluded that there were a limited number of VC fighters in South Vietnam and that a war of attrition would destroy them. He applied metrics (body counts) to determine how close to success his plan was. Faced with a guerrilla war, the question of holding territory was irrelevant as the VC never operated for extended periods in areas where the Americans were strong and if the Americans occupied an area in force, the VC simply moved to other areas where the American presence was weaker. Westmoreland had decided, with the support of McNamara, to defend all of South Vietnam, believing that he could win via a strategy of attrition as he would simply inflict enough losses to end the enemy's ability to wage war. McNamara devised the "body count" measurement to determine how well the Americans were doing, reasoning if the Americans were inflicting heavy losses as measured by the "body count", it must be a sign that they were winning. General William Peers wrote critically of the "body count" strategy, stating: "...with improper leadership, 'body count' could create competition between units, particularly if these statistics were compared like baseball standings and there were no stringent requirements as to how and by whom the counts were to be made".  The obsession with "body counts" led to much exaggeration of the losses inflicted on the enemy as the officers with the highest "body counts" were promoted while also fueling a grisly competition between units to achieve the highest "body counts" that led to innocent civilians being killed to inflate their daily "body counts". It is generally accepted by historians that the vast daily losses that U.S. officers claimed to have inflicted on the VC were fabricated as many officers desperate for a promotion reported "body counts" well above what they were actually achieving.

The U.S. Army sabotaged the efforts of Kennedy and McNamara to develop a more counterinsurgency role by simply declaring that the Army's basic unit, the division, was flexible enough to engage against guerrillas while also promising that the traditional fondness for using maximum firepower would not present a problem as firepower use would be "discriminating". In Vietnam, this led to divisions, whose size limited them and their supply trains to the road, using massive amounts of firepower against guerrillas who were often "nimble" enough to evade all of the firepower brought to bear. Instead, the standard tactics of bringing massive firepower to bear in the form of napalm and artillery strikes against the guerrillas often killed civilians, fueling support for the VC. The Special Forces did fight in Vietnam, but only as an adjutant to the traditional infantry and armored divisions, which did most of the fighting.  In a 1966 memo, McNamara admitted that the sort of counterinsurgency war envisioned by Kennedy with the Special Forces leading the fight had not occurred, and wrote that the responsibility for this "undoubtedly lies with bad management" on the part of the Army.

Disenchantment
Up to November 1965, McNamara, who had been a supporter of the war, first started to have doubts about the war, saying at a press conference that "it will be a long war", which completely contradicted his previous optimistic statements that the war would be brought to a close soon.  Although he was a prime architect of the Vietnam War and repeatedly overruled the JCS on strategic matters, McNamara gradually became skeptical about whether the war could be won by deploying more troops to South Vietnam and intensifying the bombing of North Vietnam, a claim he would publish in a book years later. He also stated later that his support of the war was given out of loyalty to administration policy. He traveled to South Vietnam many times to study the situation firsthand and became increasingly reluctant to approve the large force increments requested by the military commanders.

As a Christmas gesture, Johnson ordered a bombing pause over North Vietnam and went off to his ranch in Texas for the holidays. McNamara went with his family for skiing in Colorado, but upon hearing that the president was open to extending the bombing pause for a few more days, he left his family at the sky lodge in the Rockies to fly to the Johnson ranch on 27 December 1965. McNamara knew that Johnson tended to listen to the advice of Rusk who saw extending the bombing pause as weakness, and wanted a meeting with Johnson without Rusk present. McNamara argued to the president in a three hour long meeting that the North Vietnamese would not open peace talks unless the bombing were stopped first, as they kept saying repeatedly, and persuaded Johnson to extend the bombing pause into January. At a New Year's Eve party attended by Washington's elite to welcome 1966, McNamara expressed doubts about America's ability to win the war. A week later at a dinner party attended by the economist John Kenneth Galbraith and Johnson's speechwriter Dick Goodwin, McNamara stated that victory was unobtainable, and the best that could be achieved was an "honorable withdrawal" that might save South Vietnam as a state. In February 1966, during the Honolulu conference, McNamara during an "off-the-record" chat with a group of journalists spoke about the war in very jaded terms, stating frankly that Operation Rolling Thunder was a failure. McNamara stated that North Vietnam was a backward Third World country that did not have the same advanced industrial infrastructure of First World nations, making the bombing offensive useless. McNamara concluded: "No amount of bombing can end the war". Karnow, one of the journalists present during the "off-the-record" conversation, described McNamara's personality as having changed, noting the Defense Secretary, who was normally so arrogant and self-assured, convinced he could "scientifically" solve any problem, as being subdued and clearly less self-confident.

In October 1966, McNamara returned from yet another visit to South Vietnam, full of confidence in public and doubt in private.   McNamara told the media that "process has exceeded our expectations" while telling the president he saw "no reasonable way to bring the war to an end soon".  Though McNamara reported to Johnson that American forces were inflicting heavy losses on the North Vietnamese and VC, he added that they could "more than replace" their losses and that "full security exists nowhere" in South Vietnam, even in areas supposedly "pacified" by the Americans. Worst of all, McNamara complained that the South Vietnamese were still not carrying their full share of the load, as they expected the Americans to do all the fighting for them, stating: "This important war must be fought and won by the Vietnamese themselves. We have known this from the beginning. But the discouraging truth is that, as was the case in 1961 and 1963 and 1965, we have not found the formula, the catalyst, for training and inspiring them into effective action".

In October 1966, he launched Project 100,000, the lowering of army IQ standards which allowed 354,000 additional men to be recruited, despite criticism that they were not suited to working in high stress or dangerous environments.

In November 1966, McNamara visited Harvard University and the car driving him to see Henry Kissinger was surrounded by anti-war protesters who forced the automobile to stop The students refused to let the car move until McNamara debated their leader, Michael Ansara, the president of the Harvard chapter of Students for a Democratic Society. McNamara agreed to the debate, and standing on the hood of his car answered the charge from a student in the crowd that the United States was waging aggression by saying the war started in 1954, not 1957, which he knew "because the International Control Commission wrote a report that said so. You haven't read it, and if you have, you obviously didn't understand it". When the student answered that he had read the International Control Commission's report and it did not say that, McNamara responded he had been a far better university student than his opponent, saying "I was tougher than you then and I'm tougher today! I was more courteous then, and I hope I'm more courteous today!". As McNamara continued to insult the crowd and the mood grew more ugly, he fled into Quincy House, from which he escaped via underground tunnels to see Kissinger. The confrontation with the students had shaken him, and it took half an hour before he was ready to address Kissinger's class.

Because the effects of Operation Rolling Thunder were more easily measured than with the ground war, McNamara was especially troubled by the revelation that the bombing offensive had not caused the collapse of North Vietnam's economy as predicted.  In June 1967, American bombers hit North Vietnam's hydroelectric plants and reduced North Vietnam capacity to generate electricity by 85%, according to McNamara's calculations. At the same time, he also calculated that the annual amount of electricity generated in North Vietnam was equal only to a fifth of the electricity generated every year at the Potomac Electric Power Company's plant in Alexandria, Virginia, making the destruction of North Vietnamese power plants meaningless to the outcome of the war as the amount of electricity generated was so small. He also calculated in 1967 that over the last two years, American bombers had inflicted damage on North Vietnam equal to about $300 million while at the same time, Rolling Thunder had cost the U.S. Air Force about 700 aircraft shot down over North Vietnam whose total value was about $900 million, making the bombing campaign uneconomical. McNamara's doubts were encouraged by his civilian aides such as Leslie H. Gelb and John McNaughton, who complained that their wives and teenage children were chiding them as "war criminals" when they came home from work. McNamara's own teenage son, Robert Craig McNamara, was opposed to the war and denounced his father when he came from work every day. McNamara was shocked to discover that the American flag was hanging upside down in his son's bedroom as the younger McNamara told him that he was ashamed of America because of him. McNaughton told McNamara that after having talked to some of the young people that "a feeling is widely and strongly held...that 'the Establishment' is out of its mind" and the dominant opinion was "that we are trying to impose some U.S. image on distant peoples we cannot understand and that we carrying the thing to absurd lengths."

In a memo of 19 May 1967 to the president, McNamara stated the military side of the war was going well with the Americans killing thousands of the enemy every month, but the political side was not, as South Vietnam remained as dysfunctional as ever. He wrote: "Corruption is widespread. Real government control is confined to enclaves. There is rot in the fabric". McNamara wrote that the idea that the American forces would temporarily stabilize the situation so the South Vietnamese could take over the war themselves was flawed as the dysfunctional South Vietnamese state would never be able to win the war, thus meaning the Americans would have to stay in Vietnam for decades to come. He advised Johnson not to accept Westmoreland's call for an additional 200,000 soldiers as that would mean calling up the Reserves, which in turn would require a wartime economy. The economic sacrifices that ending the peacetime economy would entail would make it almost politically impossible to negotiate peace, and in effect would mean placing the hawks in charge, which was why those of a hawkish inclination kept pressing for the Reserves to be called up. The economic sacrifices could only be justified to the American people by saying the war would be brought to a victorious conclusion. McNamara rejected the advice of the hawks, warning that steps such as bombing North Vietnam's dikes and locks to flood the farmland with the aim of causing a famine; mining the coast of North Vietnam to sink Soviet ships bringing in arms; invading Laos and Cambodia; and finally in the last resort using nuclear weapons if the other measures failed were likely to alienate world opinion and increase domestic opposition. McNamara wrote: "The picture of the world's greatest superpower killing or seriously injuring 1,000 noncombatants a week, while trying to pound a tiny backward nation into submission on an issue whose merits are hotly disputed, is not a pretty one". Finally, McNamara dismissed the Domino Theory as irrelevant since General Suharto had seized power in Indonesia in 1965 and proceeded to wipe out the Indonesian Communist Party, the third-largest in the world, killing hundreds of thousands of Indonesian Communists. He argued that with Suharto in power in Indonesia that "the trend in Asia was now running in America's favor, which reduced the importance of South Vietnam". To the Americans, Indonesia was the most important of all the "dominoes" in Southeast Asia, and McNamara argued that even if the South Vietnamese "domino" were to fall, the Indonesian "domino" would still stand. 

McNamara commissioned the Vietnam Study Task Force on June 17, 1967. He was inspired by the confrontation at Harvard the previous November as he had discovered that the students he had been debating knew more about Vietnam's history than he did. The task was assigned to Gelb and six officials who were instructed by McNamara to examine just how and why the United States became involved in Vietnam, starting with American relations with the Viet Minh in World War Two. Though Gelb was a hawk who had written pro-war speeches for the Republican Senator Jacob Javits, he and his team became disillusioned as they wrote the history; at one point when discussing what were the lessons of Vietnam, Paul Gorman, one of the historians went up to the blackboard to write simply, "Don't." By April 1969, The Report of the Office of the Secretary of Defense Vietnam Task Force, as the Pentagon Papers were officially titled, was finished, but widely ignored within the government. Intended as the official record of US military involvement in Indochina, the final report ran to 3,000 pages and was classified as "Top Secret – Sensitive."  The report was ultimately leaked in 1971 to the New York Times by Daniel Ellsberg, a former aide to McNamara's Assistant Secretary of Defense, John McNaughton. The leak became known as the Pentagon Papers, revealing that McNamara and others had been aware that the Vietnam offensive was futile. Subsequent efforts by the Nixon administration to prevent such leaks led indirectly to the Watergate scandal. In an interview, McNamara said that the Domino Theory was the main reason for entering the Vietnam War. He also stated, "Kennedy hadn't said before he died whether, faced with the loss of Vietnam, he would [completely] withdraw; but I believe today that had he faced that choice, he would have withdrawn."

Equality of opportunity
To commemorate President Harry S Truman's signing an order to end segregation in the military, McNamara issued Directive 5120.36 on July 26, 1963. This directive, Equal Opportunity in the Armed Forces, dealt directly with the issue of racial and gender discrimination in areas surrounding military communities. The directive declared, "Every military commander has the responsibility to oppose discriminatory practices affecting his men and their dependents and to foster equal opportunity for them, not only in areas under his immediate control, but also in nearby communities where they may live or gather in off-duty hours." (para. II.C.)  Under the directive, commanding officers were obligated to use the economic power of the military to influence local businesses in their treatment of minorities and women. With the approval of the Secretary of Defense, the commanding officer could declare areas off-limits to military personnel for discriminatory practices.

Expulsion of the Chagos islanders

In July 1961, McNamara was informed by the British Defense Minister, Peter Thorneycroft, that the financial burden of trying to maintain British forces around the world was too much, and that the British Prime Minister Harold Macmillan was considering a withdrawal of all British forces "East of Suez" to end the British military presence in Asia. McNamara was opposed to this and the U.S. Navy began lobby for Britain to allow an American naval base to be set up in the Indian Ocean. This was endorsed in a Joint Chiefs of Staff memo in January 1962 which expressed concern with the rise nationalist movements in British colonies which could seek the withdrawal of American forces.

In September 1962, Thorneycroft visited Washington to meet McNamara and to begin talks about which British island in the Indian Ocean was to have the American base. By 1963, the Americans had selected the island of Diego Garcia in the Chagos Archipelago, which was part of the British Crown colony of Mauritius as the ideal place for a and naval bases. McNamara offered to have the United States pay $15 million U.S. dollars annually in rent to the British government for a base in Diego Garcia, a sum that was agreeable to London. In 1965, the Chagos islands were severed from the Mauritius and turned into the British Indian Ocean Territory as the prelude for the projected American base.

In 1966, in a meeting with Defense Minister Denis Healey, McNamara pressed for the British to remain in Asia, saying he wanted them to keep their base in Singapore. Healey offered evasive answers, claiming that his government wanted to keep the Singapore base, but their financial costs was draining the British exchequer. In July 1966, McNamara told Johnson that it was "absolutely essential" for the British to remain "East of Suez", citing political rather military reasons, namely that it showed the importance of the region, which thus justified the America's involvement in Vietnam. To placate the Americans, the British were willing to offer a lease on Diego Garcia on almost any terms favorable to the Americans. The Americans informed the British that they wanted all of the Chagossians expelled from the island, a request to which the British agreed. In January 1968, Wilson announced that with the exception of Hong Kong, all British forces would be withdrawn "East of Suez" in order to save money. Starting in 1968, the British bagan expelling the Chagossians from Diego Garcia with the process completed by 1973.

ABM
Toward the end of his term McNamara also opposed an anti-ballistic missile (ABM) system proposed for installation in the U.S. in defense against Soviet missiles, arguing the $40 billion "in itself is not the problem; the penetrability of the proposed shield is the problem." Under pressure to proceed with the ABM program after it became clear that the Soviets had begun a similar project, McNamara finally agreed to a "light" system which he believed could protect against the far smaller number of Chinese missiles. However, he never believed it was wise for the United States to move in that direction because of psychological risks of relying too much on nuclear weaponry and that there would be pressure from many directions to build a larger system than would be militarily effective.

He always believed that the best defense strategy for the U.S. was a parity of mutually assured destruction with the Soviet Union. An ABM system would be an ineffective weapon as compared to an increase in deployed nuclear missile capacity.

Departure

McNamara wrote of his close personal friendship with Jackie Kennedy and how she demanded that he stop the killing in Vietnam. As McNamara grew more and more controversial after 1966 and his differences with the President and the Joint Chiefs of Staff over Vietnam strategy became the subject of public speculation, frequent rumors surfaced that he would leave office. By 1967, McNamara was suffering visibly from the nervous strain as he went days without shaving and he suffered spasms where his jaw would quiver uncontrollably for hours. Johnson said about him: "You know, he's a fine man, a wonderful man, Bob McNamara. He has given everything, just about everything, and, you know, we just can't afford another Forrestal" (a reference to the first Defense Secretary, James Forrestal, who committed suicide due to work-related stress and depression).  

Senator John C. Stennis was a conservative Southern Democrat who enjoyed much influence as a senior member of the Senate Armed Forces Committee. Stennis saw himself more as a champion of the military rather than its overseer, and as such the military often leaked information to him, in the full knowledge that he would take up their cause on Capitol Hill. Reflecting their unhappiness with McNamara's leadership, in the spring of 1967 senior generals and admirals let Stennis know of their belief that the Defense Secretary was mismanaging the war. This led Stennis to schedule hearings for the Senate Armed Forces Committee in August 1967 to examine the charge that "unskilled civilian amateurs" (i.e. McNamara) were not letting "professional military experts" win the war. He charged that McNamara had placed too many restrictions on bombing North Vietnam to protect innocent North Vietnamese civilians. The chairman of the Senate Armed Forces Committee, Senator Richard Russell Jr., was opposed to the war, but he expressed his opposition in the most cautious and lukewarm terms as he did not wish to appear unpatriotic, and so the hawkish Stennis enjoyed more power than his title of deputy chairman of the committee would suggest.

The hearings opened on 8 August 1967, and Stennis called as his witnesses numerous admirals and Air Force generals who all testified to their belief that the United States was fighting with "one arm tied behind its back", implicitly criticizing McNamara's leadership. They complained of "overtly restrictive controls" in bombing North Vietnam that they claimed were preventing them from winning the war. When McNamara himself appeared as a witness  before the Senate Armed Forces Committee on 25 August 1967, he defended the war in very lukewarm terms that strongly suggested he had lost faith in the war, testifying that the bombing campaign against North Vietnam was ineffective, making the question of the bombing restrictions meaningless. McNamara described all of the 57 restricted targets as either of no importance such as a tire factory in Hanoi that produced only 30 tires per day or carried too much risk of hitting Soviet ships bringing supplies to North Vietnam. He warned that the prospect of American bombers damaging or sinking Soviet merchantmen while wounding or killing Soviet sailors carried too much risk of causing World War Three. McNamara testified that the bombing campaign had failed to reduce the supplies coming down the Ho Chi Minh Trail as the Viet Cong needed only 15 tons of supplies per day to continue to fight and "even if the quantity were five times that amount, it could be transported by only a few trucks". McNamara went on to say that the bombing raids had not damaged the North Vietnamese economy which was "agrarian and simple" and the North Vietnamese people were unfamiliar with "the modern comforts and conveniences that most of us in the Western world take for granted". McNamara also stated that North Vietnamese morale was not broken by the bombing offensive as the North Vietnamese people were "accustomed to discipline and are no strangers to deprivation and death" while everything indicated the leadership in Hanoi were not affected by the bombing raids. Thus, he lacked "any confidence that they can be bombed to the negotiating table". McNamara concluded that only some sort of genocide could actually win the war, stating: "Enemy operations in the south cannot, on the basis of any reports I have seen be stopped by air bombardment-short, that is, of the virtual annihilation of North Vietnam and its people".

Besides Stennis, the other members of the Senate Armed Forces Committee were senators Henry M. Jackson, Strom Thurmond and Stuart Symington, all of whom were very hostile to McNamara in their questioning of him. Senator Thurmond reproached McNamara: "I think it is a statement of placating the Communists. It is a statement of appeasing the Communists. It is a statement of no-win". Privately, McNamara felt that Thurmond was an "ass", saying he was a bigoted, ignorant Southern politician whose only values were a mindless militarism, a fervent belief in white supremacy and a fondness for marrying women far younger than himself. McNamara felt that it was beneath him to be questioned by Thurmond, which explained why he was notably truculent in his answers to him.     

Stennis wrote the committee's report which accused McNamara of having "consistently overruled the unanimous recommendations of military commanders and the joint chiefs of staff", whom Stennis wrote had proposed "systematic, timely and hard-hitting actions". Stennis damned McNamara for putting in bombing restrictions to protect North Vietnamese civilians and claimed that the war could be easily won if only McNamara would just obey all of the advice he received from the military. Stennis was not influenced by the hearings as he had written the committee's report before the hearings had even began. Johnson saw the hearings as proof that it was time to dismiss McNamara, whom he believed was "cracking up" under the strain of the war, as reflected in the Defense Secretary's criticism of the Rolling Thunder bombings. Stennis, an ardent white supremacist who had fiercely opposed Johnson's civil rights legislation, was an old enemy of Johnson's, which led the president to decide not to sack McNamara in August 1967 as that would be seen as a victory by Stennis, and instead to wait a few months to fire him. In an interview with his biographer, Doris Kearns Goodwin, Johnson stated that McNamara was "cracking up" as the pressures of the war were too much for him, and so he decided to fire him as it would have been "a damn unfair thing to force him to stay". Johnson had long resented and hated the Kennedy brothers, whom he thought looked down upon him as "white trash" from Texas. Senator Robert F. Kennedy had emerged as a leading critic of the war by 1967, and Johnson stated to Kearns his belief that McNamara had suffered a nervous breakdown, of which Kennedy, a close friend of McNamara, had taken advantage of. Johnson told Kearns: "Every day, Bobby [Kennedy] would call up McNamara telling him that the war was terrible and immoral, and that he had to leave". To soften the blow, Johnson claimed to Kearns that he had talked it over with McNamara and had decided to offer him the presidency of the World Bank, "the only job he really wanted then". Johnson had chosen the job of World Bank president for McNamara because its rules prohibited the president from involving himself in the domestic affairs of member nations, which would prevent McNamara from criticizing the war after he left office. Johnson's biggest fear was that if he fired McNamara, then he might join with Kennedy in criticizing him and the war; given his status as the longest-serving Defense Secretary, such criticism would be especially damaging. 

When a reporter asked McNamara if the Stennis hearings indicated a rift between him and the Joint Chiefs of Staff, McNamara replied: "My polices don't differ with those of the Joint Chiefs and I think they would be the first to say it". General Earle "Bus" Wheeler, the Chairman of the Joint Chiefs of Staff had become dissatisfied with McNamara's leadership and was outraged by that remark. In response to McNamara's claim that the Joint Chiefs supported him, he proposed that the Joint Chiefs all resign in protest at McNamara's leadership. General Harold K. Johnson of the Army, who erroneously blamed McNamara for Johnson's decision not to call up the Reserves in 1965, agreed to Wheeler's plan with his only regret being that he did not resign in 1965. The plan collapsed when General Wallace M. Greene of the Marine Corps refused to go along with it.

On 21 October 1967, McNamara saw the March on the Pentagon anti-war protest from his office in the Pentagon. He witnessed hippie girls placing flowers in the guns of the D.C National Guardsman standing in front of the Pentagon. McNamara described the scene as "hellish" as the hippie girls bared their breasts to tempt the Guardsman to "make love, not war" while other hippies spat in the faces of the Guardsmen. However, despite seeing the March on the Pentagon demonstrators as a sign of social decay, his characteristic competitive spirit came to the fore as he argued that if he had been leading the March on the Pentagon, he would have taken over the Pentagon and shut it down, saying hippies lacked the necessary discipline and intelligence. On 31 October 1967, McNamara wrote Johnson a memo which he sent the next day saying that the war could not be continued as it "would be dangerous, costly in lives and unsatisfactory to the American people". Johnson wrote on the margins on the memo remarks such as "How do we get this conclusion?" and "Why believe this?"

In an early November 1967 memorandum to Johnson, McNamara's recommendation to freeze troop levels, stop bombing North Vietnam and for the U.S. to hand over ground fighting to South Vietnam was rejected outright by the President. McNamara's recommendations amounted to his saying that the strategy of the United States in Vietnam which had been pursued to date had failed. McNamara later stated he "never heard back" from Johnson regarding the memo. Largely as a result, on November 29 of that year, McNamara announced his pending resignation and that he would become President of the World Bank. Other factors were the increasing intensity of the anti-war movement in the U.S., the approaching presidential campaign in which Johnson was expected to seek re-election, and McNamara's support—over the objections of the Joint Chiefs of Staff, of construction along the 17th parallel separating South and North Vietnam of a line of fortifications running from the coast of Vietnam into Laos. The President's announcement of McNamara's move to the World Bank stressed his stated interest in the job and that he deserved a change after seven years as Secretary of Defense (longer than any of his predecessors or successors).

Others give a different view of McNamara's departure from office. For example, Stanley Karnow in his book Vietnam: A History strongly suggests that McNamara was asked to leave by the President. The historian Arthur Schlesinger, Jr stated that he was present during a conversation between McNamara and Senator Kennedy during which the former told the latter that he only learned from reading the newspapers of Johnson's announcement that he had just "resigned" as Defense Secretary and had been appointed president of the World Bank. McNamara himself expressed uncertainty about the question. On 17 November 1967, a story in the Financial Times of London based on leaked sources in Washington stated McNamara was going to be the next World Bank president, which came as a considerable surprise to McNamara. Afterwards, McNamara met with Kennedy who told him to resign in protest and denounce the war as unwinnable, counsel that McNamara rejected, saying that Johnson had been a friend and that he was still loyal to him. When McNamara refused to resign, Kennedy told him that he should turn down the World Bank presidency and join him in criticizing the war, which McNamara refused to do. Johnson knew that McNamara was concerned about poverty in the Third World, and that the possibility of serving as World Bank president would be too tempting for McNamara to resist.

McNamara left office on February 29, 1968; for his efforts, the President awarded him both the Medal of Freedom and the Distinguished Service Medal. McNamara's last day as Defense Secretary was a memorable one. The hawkish National Security Adviser, Walt Whitman Rostow, argued at a cabinet meeting that day that the United States was on the verge of winning the war. Rostow urged Johnson to send 206,000 more American troops to South Vietnam to join the half-million already there and to drastically increase the number of bombing raids on North Vietnam. At that point, McNamara snapped in fury at Rostow, saying: "What then? This goddamned bombing campaign, it's worth nothing, it's done nothing, they dropped more bombs than on all of Europe in all of World War II and it hasn't done a fucking thing!" McNamara then broke down in tears, saying to Johnson to just accept that the war could not be won and stop listening to Rostow. Henry McPherson, an aide to the president, recalled the scene: "He reeled off the familiar statistics-how we had dropped more bombs on Vietnam than on all of Europe during World War II. Then his voice broke, and there were tears on his eyes as he spoke of the futility, the crushing futility of the air war. The rest of us sat silently-I for one with my mouth open, listening to the secretary of defense talk that way about a campaign for which he had, ultimately, been responsible. I was pretty shocked".  

Shortly after McNamara departed the Pentagon, he published The Essence of Security, discussing various aspects of his tenure and position on basic national security issues. He did not speak out again on defense issues or Vietnam until after he left the World Bank.

World Bank president

Robert McNamara served as head of the World Bank from April 1968 to June 1981, when he turned 65. In March 1968, McNamara's friend Senator Robert Kennedy entered the Democratic primaries with aim of challenging Johnson. Kennedy asked McNamara to tape a statement praising his leadership during the Cuban Missile Crisis with the understanding that the statement was meant for a TV ad. McNamara praised Kennedy's "shrewd diplomacy", saying he had "remained calm and cool, firm, but restrained, never nettled and never rattled". Though this was a violation of World Bank rules, McNamara felt guilty over refusing Kennedy's requests to resign and decline the World Bank presidency. He was attacked for the tape with the New York Times in an editorial lambasting him for his "poor judgement and poorer taste". For a moment, McNamara feared he would be fired from the World Bank.

A safe was installed in McNamara's office at the World Bank to house his papers relating to his time as Defense Secretary, which was a normal courtesy extended to former Defense Secretaries who might face controversy over their actions and wish to defend themselves by quoting from the documentary record. When the Pentagon Papers were finished in April 1969, and a copy of the Papers were brought into McNamara's office, he became angry and said: "I don't want to see it! Take it back!" By 1969, McNamara wanted to forget the Vietnam war and did not want any reminders of his former job.

Tenure 
In his 13 years at the Bank, he introduced key changes, most notably, shifting the Bank's economic development policies toward targeted poverty reduction. Prior to his tenure at the World Bank, poverty did not receive substantial attention as part of international and national economic development; the focus of development had been on industrialization and infrastructure. Poverty also came to be redefined as a condition faced by people rather than countries. According to Martha Finnemore, the World Bank under McNamara's tenure "sold" states poverty reduction "through a mixture of persuasion and coercion." McNamara negotiated, with the conflicting countries represented on the Board, a growth in funds to channel credits for development, in the form of health, food, and education projects. He also instituted new methods of evaluating the effectiveness of funded projects. One notable project started during McNamara's tenure was the effort to prevent river blindness.

In 1972, McNamara visited Santiago to meet President Salvador Allende to discuss the latter's policy of nationalization, especially of the copper mining companies. McNamara's son, Craig McNamara was living in Chile at the time, but the two did not meet owing to the rift over the Vietnam war. McNamara fils stated in 1984: "I think my father truly respected Allende-his compassion, his humility. But he disapproved of the nationalizations". The meeting with Allende concluded with McNamara ending all World Bank loans to Chile. On 11 September 1973, Allende was overthrown in a coup d'etat led by General Augusto Pinochet. In 1974, McNamara visited Santiago to meet Pinochet and agreed to the World Bank resuming loans to Chile. Craig McNamara, who was visiting the United States at the time of the coup and chose not to return to Chile was outraged by the decision to resume the loans, telling his father in a phone call: "You can't do this-you always say the World Bank is not a political institution, but financing Pinochet clearly would be". McNamara pere flatly stated in reply: "It's too late. I've already made my decision". McNamara fils feels that his father's claim that he had to cease loans to Chile because the Allende government's nationalization policy was an "economic" matter that fell within the purview of the World Bank, but human rights abuses under Pinochet were a "political" matter that was outside of the World Bank's purview was disingenuous and dishonest. Craig McNamara stated: "I was really upset by that. That was hard to mend".

The World Bank currently has a scholarship program under his name.

As World Bank President, he declared at the 1968 Annual Meeting of the International Monetary Fund and the World Bank Group that countries permitting birth control practices would get preferential access to resources. During the emergency in India, McNamara remarked "At long last, India is moving to effectively address its population problem," regarding the forced sterilization.

Post-World Bank activities and assessments

From 1981 to 1984, McNamara served on the Board of Trustees at American University in Washington, D.C.

He was elected to the American Philosophical Society in 1981.

In 1982, McNamara joined several other former national security officials in urging that the United States pledge to not use nuclear weapons first in Europe in the event of hostilities; subsequently he proposed the elimination of nuclear weapons as an element of NATO's defense posture.

In 1993, Washington journalist Deborah Shapley published a 615-page biography of Robert McNamara titled Promise and Power: The Life and Times of Robert McNamara. Shapley concluded her book with these words: "For better and worse McNamara shaped much in today's world—and imprisoned himself. A little-known nineteenth century writer, F.W. Boreham, offers a summation: 'We make our decisions. And then our decisions turn around and make us.'"

McNamara's memoir, In Retrospect: The Tragedy and Lessons of Vietnam, published in 1995, presented an account and analysis of the Vietnam War from his point of view. According to his lengthy New York Times obituary, "[h]e concluded well before leaving the Pentagon that the war was futile, but he did not share that insight with the public until late in life. In 1995, he took a stand against his own conduct of the war, confessing in a memoir that it was 'wrong, terribly wrong'." In return, he faced a "firestorm of scorn" at that time. In November 1995, McNamara returned to Vietnam, this time visiting Hanoi.   Despite his role as one of the architects of Operation Rolling Thunder, McNamara met with a surprisingly warm reception, even from those who survived the bombing raids, and was often asked to autograph pirate editions of In Retrospect which had been illegally translated and published in Vietnam.  During his visit, McNamara met his opposite number during the war, General Võ Nguyên Giáp who served as North Vietnam's Defense Minister. The American historian Charles Neu who was present at the McNamara-Giáp meeting observed the differences in the style of the two men with McNamara repeatedly interrupting Giáp to ask questions, usually related to something numerical, while Giáp gave a long leisurely monologue, quoting various Vietnamese cultural figures such as poets, that began with Vietnamese revolts against China during the years 111 BC–938 AD when Vietnam was a Chinese province.  Neu wrote his impression was that McNamara was a figure who thought in the short term while Giáp thought in the long term.

The Fog of War: Eleven Lessons from the Life of Robert S. McNamara is a 2003 Errol Morris documentary consisting mostly of interviews with Robert McNamara and archival footage. It went on to win the Academy Award for Documentary Feature. The particular structure of this personal account is accomplished with the characteristics of an intimate dialogue. As McNamara explains, it is a process of examining the experiences of his long and controversial period as the United States Secretary of Defense, as well as other periods of his personal and public life.

McNamara maintained his involvement in politics in his later years, delivering statements critical of the Bush administration's 2003 invasion of Iraq. On January 5, 2006, McNamara and most living former Secretaries of Defense and Secretaries of State met briefly at the White House with President Bush to discuss the war.

Personal life
McNamara married Margaret Craig, his teenage sweetheart, on August 13, 1940. She was an accomplished cook, and Robert's favorite dish was reputed to be her beef bourguignon. Margaret McNamara, a former teacher, used her position as a Cabinet spouse to launch a reading program for young children, Reading Is Fundamental, which became the largest literacy program in the country. She died of cancer in 1981. Later that summer, her ashes were scattered by her family on a mountainside meadow at Buckskin Pass, near Snowmass Village, Colorado.

The couple had two daughters and a son. The son Robert Craig McNamara, who as a student objected to the Vietnam War, is now a walnut and grape farmer in California. He is the owner of Sierra Orchards in Winters, California. Daughter Kathleen McNamara Spears is a forester with the World Bank. The second daughter is Margaret Elizabeth Pastor.

In the Errol Morris documentary, McNamara reports that both he and his wife were stricken with polio shortly after the end of World War II. Although McNamara had a relatively short stay in the hospital, his wife's case was more serious and it was concern over meeting her medical bills that led to his decision to not return to Harvard but to enter private industry as a consultant at Ford Motor Company.

At Ford 

When working at Ford Motor Company, McNamara resided in Ann Arbor, Michigan, rather than the usual auto executive domains of Grosse Pointe, Birmingham, and Bloomfield Hills. He and his wife sought to remain connected with a university town (the University of Michigan) after their hopes of returning to Harvard after the war were put on hold.

Alumnus of the Year 

In 1961, he was named Alumnus of the Year by the University of California, Berkeley.

Attempted assault 

On September 29, 1972, a passenger on the ferry to Martha's Vineyard recognized McNamara on board and attempted to throw him into the ocean. McNamara declined to press charges. The man remained anonymous but was interviewed years later by author Paul Hendrickson, who quoted the attacker as saying, "I just wanted to confront (McNamara) on Vietnam."

Final years and death 
After his wife's death, McNamara dated Katharine Graham, with whom he had been friends since the early 1960s. Graham died in 2001.

In September 2004, McNamara wed Diana Masieri Byfield, an Italian-born widow who had lived in the United States for more than 40 years. It was her second marriage. She was married to Ernest Byfield, a former OSS officer and Chicago hotel owner, thirty years her senior, whose first wife, Gladys Rosenthal Tartiere, leased her 400-acre (1.6 km²) Glen Ora estate in Middleburg, Virginia, to John F. Kennedy during his presidency.

At the end of his life McNamara was a life trustee on the Board of Trustees of the California Institute of Technology (Caltech), a trustee of the Economists for Peace and Security, a trustee of the American University of Nigeria, and an honorary trustee for the Brookings Institution.

McNamara died at his home in Washington, D.C., at 5:30 am on July 6, 2009, at the age of 93. He is buried at the Arlington National Cemetery in Arlington, Virginia, with the grave marker also commemorating his wives.

McNamara's papers from his years as Secretary of Defense are housed in the John F. Kennedy Presidential Library and Museum in Boston, Massachusetts.

See also
 List of California Institute of Technology trustees
 List of Eagle Scouts
 List of Presidential Medal of Freedom recipients
 List of United States political appointments that crossed party lines
 McNamara fallacy
 Path to War
 Project 100,000
 Project Dye Marker
 The Fog of War

Works
Articles
 "World Population Growth." The Journal of Social, Political, and Economic Studies, Summer 1977, pp. 115–118.
 "A New International Order and Its Implications for U.S. Foreign and Defense Policy." The PSR Quarterly, Vol. 3, No. 4, December 1993, pp. 178–182. Features Daniel Ellsberg's handwritten notes.

Books
 The Essence of Security: Reflections in Office. New York: Harper & Row, 1968.
 One Hundred Countries, Two Billion People: The Dimensions of Development. New York: Praeger, 1973.
 The McNamara Years at the World Bank: Major Policy Addresses of Robert S. McNamara, 1968-1981. Forewords by Helmut Schmidt and Léopold Senghor. Baltimore, MD: Published for the World Bank by the Johns Hopkins University Press, 1981.
 Blundering Into Disaster: Surviving the First Century of the Nuclear Age. New York: Pantheon Books, 1986.
 Out of the Cold: New Thinking for American Foreign and Defense Policy in the 21st Century. New York: Simon & Schuster, 1989.
 In Retrospect: The Tragedy and Lessons of Vietnam. New York: Times Books, 1995.
 Argument Without End: In Search of Answers to the Vietnam Tragedy. New York: Public Affairs Press, 1999.
 Beating the Odds: Crime, Poverty, and Life in the Inner City. Washington, D.C.: CWLA Press, 1999.
 Wilson's Ghost: Reducing the Risk of Conflict, Killing, and Catastrophe in the 21st Century. New York: Public Affairs Press, 2001.

Transcripts
 Civil Defense Role in U.S. Strategic Defensive Forces Outlined for Congress by Secretary McNamara. Washington, D.C.: U.S. Department of Defense, 1966.
 The Challenges for Sub-Saharan Africa.  Washington, D.C.: Sir John Crawford Memorial Lecture, 1985.
 The Changing Nature of Global Security and its Impact on South Asia. Washington, D.C.: Washington Council on Non-Proliferation, 1992.

Media
Documentary films
 The Fog of War: Eleven Lessons from the Life of Robert S. McNamara. Directed by Errol Morris. (2003) Transcript available.

Television
 Cuban Missile Crisis Revisited. Produced for The Idea Channel by the Free to Choose Network. (1983)
 Phase II, Part I (U1016) (June 27, 1983)
 Featuring Robert S. McNamara, McGeorge Bundy, Richard Neustadt, George W. Ball & U. Alexis Johnson in Washington D.C.
 Phase II, Part II (U1017) (June 27, 1983)
 Featuring Robert S. McNamara, McGeorge Bundy, Richard Neustadt, George W. Ball & U. Alexis Johnson in Washington D.C.

References

Further reading
 Basha i Novosejt, Aurélie.  'I made mistakes': Robert McNamara’s Vietnam war policy, 1960–1968 (Cambridge University Press, 2019) excerpt
 
 
 
 McCann, Leo "'Management is the gate' – but to where? Rethinking Robert McNamara's 'career lessons.'" Management and Organizational History, 11.2 (2016): 166–188.
 McMaster, Herbert R. Dereliction of duty: Johnson, McNamara, the Joint Chiefs of Staff, and the lies that led to Vietnam (1998). 
 Martin, Keir "Robert McNamara and the limits of 'bean counting'" pp. 16–19 from Anthropology Today, Volume 26, Issue #3, June 2010.
 
  .
 Rosenzweig, Phil.  "Robert S. McNamara and the Evolution of Modern Management." Harvard Business Review, 91 (2010): 87–93.
 
 
 Shapley, Deborah. Promise and Power: The life and times of Robert McNamara (1993) 
 Sharma, Patrick Allan. Robert McNamara's Other War: The World Bank and International Development (Uof Pennsylvania Press; 2017) 228 pages 
 
 Slater, Jerome. "McNamara's failuresand ours: Vietnam's unlearned lessons: A review " Security Studies 6.1 (1996): 153–195.
 Stevenson, Charles A. SECDEF: The Nearly Impossible Job of Secretary of Defense (2006). ch 3 
 Patler, Nicholas. Norman's Triumph: the Transcendent Language of Self-Immolation Quaker History, Fall 2015, 18–39.

External links

 Robert McNamara on the JFK and LBJ White House Tapes
 Federal Bureau of Investigation Records: The Vault – Robert McNamara
 AP Obituary in The Washington Post
 The Economist obituary
 Robert McNamara – Daily Telegraph obituary
 McNamara's Evil Lives On  by Robert Scheer, The Nation, July 8, 2009
 McNamara and Agent Orange
 Biography of Robert Strange McNamara (website)
 Historical Office US Department of Defense
 Interview about the Cuban Missile Crisis and Interview about nuclear strategy for the WGBH series War and Peace in the Nuclear Age.
 Annotated bibliography for Robert McNamara from the Alsos Digital Library for Nuclear Issues
 Oral History Interviews with Robert McNamara, from the Lyndon Baines Johnson Library
 
 Conversations with History: Robert S. McNamara, from the University of California Television (UCTV)

|-

|-

1916 births
2009 deaths
20th-century American politicians
American people of Irish descent
American Presbyterians
20th-century American memoirists
United States Army Air Forces personnel of World War II
American people of the Vietnam War
Burials at Arlington National Cemetery
Businesspeople from Michigan
Businesspeople from Oakland, California
Military personnel from California
California Republicans
Educators from California
Ford executives
Harvard Business School alumni
Harvard Business School faculty
Kennedy administration cabinet members
Lyndon B. Johnson administration cabinet members
People from Piedmont, California
People of the Defense Intelligence Agency
Politicians from Oakland, California
Presidential Medal of Freedom recipients
Presidents of the World Bank Group
Recipients of the Distinguished Service Medal (US Army)
Recipients of the Legion of Merit
United States Army Air Forces officers
United States Secretaries of Defense
University of California, Berkeley alumni
Writers from Oakland, California
Writers from San Francisco
Writers from Washington, D.C.
Urban Institute people
Civilian recipients of the Distinguished Service Medal (United States)
United States Army colonels
Members of the American Philosophical Society